Image Is Everything is Jughead's Revenge's fourth studio album, released in 1996. It was the band's first release on the label Nitro Records (owned by The Offspring's Dexter Holland), who would release the rest of their albums before their indefinite hiatus in 2001.  Nitro re-issued this album to iTunes in 2008, along with Just Joined and Pearly Gates.

Tracks

Personnel
 Joe Doherty − vocals
 Joey Rimicci − guitar
 Brian Preiss − bass
 Jarrod Thornton − drums

References

1996 albums
Jughead's Revenge albums
Nitro Records albums